Puskás Ferenc Stadion (Puskás Aréna) is a station of the M2 (East-West) line of the Budapest Metro. Puskás Aréna is located here, as well as the Budapest Sports Arena.

It was first opened on 2 April 1970 as part of the inaugural section of Line 2, between Deák Ferenc tér and Örs vezér tere
and named Népstadion (English: People's Stadium) until 1 January 2004. Between 2004 and 2011 the station's name was Stadionok (Stadiums). It is located in the 14th district of Budapest.

Connections
Bus: 95, 130, 195
Tram: 1, 1M
Trolleybus: 75, 77, 80

References

M2 (Budapest Metro) stations
Railway stations opened in 1970

1970 establishments in Hungary